Article 15 is a 2019 Indian Hindi-language crime drama film directed and produced by Anubhav Sinha, who co-wrote the screenplay with Gaurav Solanki. The film stars Ayushmann Khurrana as a police detective who investigates the disappearance of three girls from a small village, uncovering a history of caste-based oppression along the way. The supporting cast includes Nassar, Manoj Pahwa, Kumud Mishra, Isha Talwar, Sayani Gupta, Mohammed Zeeshan Ayyub, Sushil Pandey, Veen Harsh and Sumbul Touqeer.

The film is named after Article 15 of the Constitution of India, which prohibits discrimination on grounds of religion, race, caste, sex or birthplace. While not based on one specific event, the film is inspired by multiple real-life cases involving crimes driven by caste-based discrimination, including the 2014 Badaun gang rape allegations and 2016 Una flogging incident. Principal photography began on 1 March 2019 in Lucknow. The film's soundtrack was composed by Anurag Saikia, Piyush Shankar, Devin Parker and Gingger with lyrics written by Rashmi Virag, Shakeel Azmi, Slow Cheeta, Dee MC, Kaam Bhaari and SpitFire, and released under the banner Zee Music Company.

Article 15 was the opening film for the 10th edition of London Indian Film Festival, premiering on 20 June 2019. It was theatrically released in India on 28 June 2019. The film received critical acclaim, with praise for its performances, direction, script, and sensitive portrayal of its subject matter, and grossed over 93.08 crore worldwide.

Plot 
In the village of Laalgaon in Uttar Pradesh, two Dalit girls are seen trapped in a school bus by some men. Ayan Ranjan, a St. Stephen's College, Delhi graduate and an Indian Police Service officer, is assigned to Laalgaon as the Additional Superintendent of Police and is warmly welcomed by officers Brahmadatt Singh and Kisan Jatav. Ayan encounters various forms of caste discrimination as soon as he arrives in the village, and periodically shares what he observes to his wife, Aditi, over the phone. Local villagers come to Ayan's reception asking the officers to find the missing girls but are turned down. Ayan reunites with his college friend Satyendra Rai, who is also a state government employee, who behaves suspiciously throughout the night.

The next morning, the girls are found hanging from a tree, while a third girl, Pooja, is reported missing. Ayan orders Brahmadatt to file an FIR and to obtain the postmortem report for the deceased girls. The girls' autopsy yields evidence that they were gang raped, but Brahmadatt prevents the release of this information and instead pushes a narrative suggesting that the girls, who were cousins, were lesbians lovers in an incestuous relationship and thus hanged by their fathers in an honor killing. Meanwhile, Jatav and a junior officer are threatened and their vehicle set on fire by followers of Nishad, leader of  Bhim Sangharsh Sena (BSS), a group of activists within the village who seek speedy justice for the crime. Ayan questions Jatav about this the next day and becomes determined to solve the case.

Gaura, Pooja's sister, informs Ayan that the girls used to work for a local builder named Anshu Naharia, who slapped Pooja after the girls asked for a raise in their salary of 3 rupees. Ayan decides to call Anshu for inquiry, even though Brahmadatt tries to persuade him not to do so, as Anshu is the son of local Minister Ramlal Naharia. During his interrogation, Anshu says that he slapped the girls in order to remind their entire caste about their place in society. Ayan, disgusted by the moral corruption of the village and its police force, posts on the police bulletin board a copy of Article 15 of the Constitution of India, which prohibits discrimination based on race, sex, religion, caste, or birthplace.

Ayan meets with Dr. Malti Ram, a member of a scheduled caste and the assistant coroner who performed the autopsy, and finds out that contrary to her official report, the girls were raped and then murdered. He asks her to go to Lucknow to examine the DNA samples and to contact only him, realizing that local law enforcement is conspiring with Ramlal Naharia to cover up the case. Meanwhile, Mahantji, a Brahmin politician vying for a local election, has formed an alliance with the head of the Laalgaon Dalit community in a show of inter-caste unity, but Nishad sees the display as a disingenuous political ploy and plans to protest it. Ayan tries to persuade Nishad to call off the protest, so he has men to help search for Pooja; Nishad refuses, but allows some of his men to aid Ayan's search.

Ayan soon gets a call from Malti, who confirms that Anshu was the one who gang-raped and murdered the two girls. Ayan gets an arrest warrant for Anshu and raids his house, but Anshu is not present. However, Ayan spots a school bus that was seen by local villagers around the time of the girls' disappearance, and investigates the nearby school (which is owned by Anshu), where he finds evidence from the scene of girls' torture and rape. Elsewhere, Anshu is staying under protection from Brahmadatt, who is revealed to be one of the rapists. Brahmadatt kills Anshu to save himself.

Panikar, a high-ranking CBI officer, arrives in Laalgaon and suspends Ayan from the case. Ayan refuses to give up his efforts and tracks down Satyendra, who admits that he was at a party hosted by Anshu the night of the crime, and that he witnessed Anshu, Brahmadatt, and police officer Nihal Singh (who works closely with Ayan) rape the girls while severely drunk and later hang their dead bodies. Ayan confronts Nihal, who commits suicide out of remorse.

Jatav arrests Brahmadatt on Ayan's command. Panikar attempts to threaten Ayan into dropping the case, but Ayan reveals he has already submitted all his evidence to the Home Minister, and sharply criticizes the bigotry and injustice against people of lower castes among Indian law enforcement. Ayan then leads other officers through a large swamp in search of Pooja. They emerge on the other side in a jungle where they find a severely dehydrated Pooja hiding inside a pipe. They rescue her, and with her statement, Brahmadutt gets eleven years of imprisonment as punishment. Mahantji wins the election, hands down.

Cast 
 Ayushmann Khurrana as ASP Ayan Ranjan IPS, Aditi's husband
 Sayani Gupta as Gaura, the sister of Pooja, one of the victims
 Nassar as CBI Officer Panikar
 Manoj Pahwa as Circle Officer Brahmadutt Singh
 Kumud Mishra as Sub Inspector Kisan Jatav
 Isha Talwar as Aditi Ranjan, Ayan's wife
 Aakash Dabhade as Satyendra Rai
 Veen Harsh as Anshu Naharia
 Mohammed Zeeshan Ayyub as Nishad
 Ronjini Chakraborty as Dr. Malti Ram
 Sumbul Touqeer Khan as Amali
 Sushil Pandey as Nihal Singh
 Ashish Verma as Mayank
 Shubhrajyoti Barat as Chandrabhan
 Sumbul Touqeer Khan as Amali Singh
Shikha Valmiki as Shanu
Isha Verma as Mamta
Suchi as Pooja
Alim Naqvi as Ramlal Naharia
Nawal Shukla as Mahantji
Kapil Tilhari as Officer Pramod Yadav
 Varun Tamta as Officer Mishra
 Noor Ahmed Tuba as Officer Vijay Seth
Shreya Awasthi as Archana Rai
Shivam Singh as Bachchu Rai
Iccha Shankar as Shanti Prasad
Tariq Iqbal as Dr. Awdhesh
Uday Vir Singh Yadav as Sukkha Singh
Vivek Kumar Yadav as Nokhai
R.D. Singh as Subodh Lal

Production 
The storyline of the film is based on the socio-political situation of the country, post-independence time drawing inferences from true-life events researched over the last 6 months, akin to Mulk. Giving details on Article 15 Anubhav Sinha stated that "this film is an investigative drama where the audience too is an accused party ... A very challenging film that needed an extraordinary actor like Ayushmann." The film is originally titled Article Victor.

Filming 
The filming started on 1 March 2019 in Lucknow. During filming on 14 March 2019, Ayushmann Khurrana the leading star of the film, and the team entered into a swamp filled with leeches to shoot scenes of the film. He shared a picture of the team on Twitter. The shooting of the film was completed in the first half of April 2019.

Release 
Article 15 had been selected as opening film for the 10th edition of London Indian Film Festival to be premiered on 20 June. It was released in India on 28 June 2019. It was made available for online streaming on Netflix. The Film is originally scheduled to release on 23 September 2014.

Critical response 
Article 15 received critical acclaim.

Anna M. M. Vetticad of Firstpost concurred with Sengupta and Sharma, gave four and a half stars out of five and found 'Sinha's unfaltering direction' was backed by Ewan Mulligan's 'unsparing cinematography' and a 'strong cast'. Concluding, she wrote, "Watching this film is an overwhelming emotional experience," and she opined, Article 15 is the best that Indian cinema can be in these troubled times if it chooses to hold a mirror up to our society..." Raja Sen writing for Hindustan Times rated the film with four and a half star out of five and opined that the film is a tribute to Alan Parker the director of 1988 film Mississippi Burning. He praised Solanki and Sinha for honest writing, haunting shots by Mulligan and performances of ensemble. Ending his writing, he said, "Article 15 is not a film in search of easy answers. Instead, it is a reminder that we already know the questions but don't ask them enough. 'Not cool, sir'." Vijayalakshmi Narayanan of Radio City gave the film four and a half stars out of five, and said "Coming to the cast, Ayushmann leads from the front and one cannot be thankful enough. The actor proves his mettle yet again when it comes to backing good scripts. He makes the right noise even in his moments of melancholy."

Sreeparna Sengupta of The Times of India gave the film four stars out of five, praising the performance of Ayushmann Khurrana, Manoj Pahwa, Kumud Mishra and Mohammed Zeeshan Ayyub, and background music and cinematography of Ewan Mulligan as well. She felt that Sinha had given another dimension to the narrative by surfacing the artful shades through the characters and setting. She opines, "Anubhav Sinha's Article 15 is designed like a crime thriller. What works for the film is that it's thought-provoking, hard-hitting while unflinchingly bringing to light burning social issues." Concluding, she wrote that the film is not a 'light watch', rather it is 'definitely relevant', 'compelling' and will start a debate. Devesh Sharma reviewing for Filmfare rates the film with four stars out of five. He praised the screenplay, dialogues, and cinematography of the film apart from the performance of Khurrana and the supporting cast. He recommends watching the film for its 'riveting performances' and its 'underlying message', and opines that the film presents the candid truth about contemporary society. Quoting Jack Nicholson's character from A Few Good Men – "You can't handle the truth," he hopes that the audience goes out to watch the film and 'learns to handle the truth...' Priyanka Sinha Jha of News18, praising Khurrana and ensemble of Kumud Sharma, Manoj Pahwa, Sayani Gupta, Mohammed Zeeshan Ayyub, and M Nassar for their performances, rates the film with four stars out of five. Agreeing with Vetticad, she writes, "Article 15 is remarkable in that it does not pontificate. It merely holds up the mirror to a society still entangled in age-old caste politics that absolutely overrides the modern ideals of liberty and equality." Concluding, she opines that Sinha has a knack for combining elements of popular film-making with realistic story-telling to give masterful films. Writing for the NDTV Saibal Chatterjee, termed it a 'radical' film, tackling social issues. He praised Sinha and Gaurav Solanki for the screenplay and cast for effective performances. He concludes the review as, "[The film] remains true to the demands of the plot without losing control over its principal purpose – administering a bitter pill with just a hint of a sugar coating. It works wonderfully well. Article 15 is a not to be missed film." Harish Wankhede in the Indian Express review praised the film for its nuanced depiction of Dalit characters but also criticised the film for not showcasing the Dalit person as a protagonist.

Mayur Sanap of Deccan Chronicle rated it four stars out of five and found it a 'gripping social thriller'. He commended the performances and script, and concludes, "With Anubhav Sinha's straightforward and unflashy directorial style, the film proves to be an effective drama. It may be devoid of spectacle, but it is still full of zeal and warrants a must-watch." Manjusha Radhakrishnan of Gulf News gave four stars out of five, and felt that the film was not easy to watch, however everyone should give it a chance. She opined, "Article 15 sobers you up instantly, but it also makes you think about Indian's complicated social segregation based on the accident of birth." Lakshana N Palat of India Today rated it with three and a half stars out of five, praised the performances of the cast and felt that the film's 'overly optimistic ending' was not in tune. According to him, despite rough around the edges and flawed in storytelling, it is worth watching. Agreeing with Sengupta, he opines, "It's a start. It cannot change society, but it at least can initiate a conversation and debate that examines the horrors that lurk in this very society, invisible to our privileged eyes." Bollywood Hungama rated the film three and a half stars out of five and praised Mulligan for cinematography, Nikhil Kovale for production design, Sinha and Solanki for story and screenplay. He commended performances of ensemble and direction of Sinha and felt that the look of the film was 'quite rich' and 'haunting', and that worked. He summed up the review as, "On the whole, ARTICLE 15 is a hard-hitting film that raises some important issues related to caste, that is plaguing the country." Kunal Guha of Mumbai Mirror rated the film with three stars out of five and felt that it reminded of hateful atrocities, and wrote, "The film, however, gets a bit tiring in parts when the message seems to be incessantly hammered down." However, he praised the performances of the ensemble.

Other critics, including Rahul Ramchandani of The Milli Gazette and Pardeep Attri of HuffPost India, noted the film's portrayal of an upper-caste Brahmin policeman as a "saviour" to the dalit. Dominique of Firstpost criticised the director for focusing less on dalit characters and more on Brahmin (upper-caste) ones just to make them "shine more brightly". An academic Shyaonti Talwar noted that the film shied away from complexities of the caste system and rather oversimplified the issue by repeating the "Brahmin-saviour' complex" done by other critically acclaimed Indian films and making a Brahmin protagonist of an "Aryan lineage" the hero.

Box office 
Article 15 had the opening day collection of 5.02 crore and opening weekend worldwide gross of 30.75 crore. In its opening week, the film grossed 47.62 crore worldwide. With a gross of 77.62 crore from India and 13.78 crore from overseas, the film has grossed 91.70 crore worldwide.

Remake 
In May 2020, it was announced that Arunraja Kamaraj would be directing Nenjuku Needhi, the Tamil remake of the film. Udhayanidhi Stalin was roped in to reprise Khurrana's role while Tanya Ravichandran reprised the role done by Isha Talwar. It was released on 20 May 2022.

Awards and nominations

Soundtrack 

The music of the film is composed by
Anurag Saikia, Piyush Shankar, Devin Parker, and Gingger while lyrics are written by Rashmi Virag, Shakeel Azmi, Slow Cheeta, Dee MC, Kaam Bhaari, and Spit Fire. The Times of India based Debarati S Sen, in her review, said the album is "a fine example of original songs finding its way back into the Hindi film industry".

Home media 
The film became available as VOD on Netflix in August 2019.

References

External links 
 
 Article 15 on Bollywood Hungama
 
 Article 15 on Informative articL

2019 crime drama films
Indian crime drama films
2010s Hindi-language films
Films about the caste system in India
Films about social issues in India
Films shot in Lucknow
2010s police procedural films
Indian films based on actual events
Crime films based on actual events
Drama films based on actual events
Fictional portrayals of the Uttar Pradesh Police
Indian police films
2019 films
Hindi-language crime films
Constitution of India
Hindi films remade in other languages